Victoria Lepădatu (born 12 June 1971) is a retired Romanian rower. She competed in coxless fours and eights at the 1992 Olympics and won a silver medal in the eights.

References

External links 
 
 
 

Living people
Romanian female rowers
Rowers at the 1992 Summer Olympics
Olympic silver medalists for Romania
Olympic rowers of Romania
Olympic medalists in rowing
Medalists at the 1992 Summer Olympics
1971 births
20th-century Romanian women